Vitaly Shibko (29 November 1948 – 24 December 2021) was a Ukrainian politician. A member of the Socialist Party of Ukraine, he served in the Verkhovna Rada from 1994 to 1998 and again from 2002 to 2007.

References

1948 births
2021 deaths
People from Synelnykove
20th-century Ukrainian politicians
21st-century Ukrainian politicians
Socialist Party of Ukraine politicians
Second convocation members of the Verkhovna Rada
Fourth convocation members of the Verkhovna Rada
Fifth convocation members of the Verkhovna Rada